Choeromorpha panayensis is a species of beetle in the family Cerambycidae. It was described by Heller in 1923. It is known from the Philippines.

Subspecies
 Choeromorpha panayensis negrosiana Hüdepohl, 1987
 Choeromorpha panayensis panayensis Heller, 1923

References

Choeromorpha
Beetles described in 1923